Nguyễn Văn Xuân (3 April 1892 – 14 January 1989) was president of the government of Cochinchina from 1947 to 1948, then prime minister of the Provisional Central Government of Vietnam from 23 May 1948 to 20 June 1949, during the First Indochina War.

First Indochina War
On 1 April 1947, he was promoted to brigadier general (two-star general, entry level for a general officer in the French army ranking system) of colonial troops, a local army with French commanding officers. After the First Indochina War, he took exile in France. On 14 January 1989, he died in Nice at the age of 96.

See also
State of Vietnam

References

Vietnamese politicians
Prime Ministers of South Vietnam
Place of death missing
1892 births
1989 deaths